In Brazilian folklore, the mapinguari or mapinguary, also called the juma, is a monstrous entity said to live in the Amazon rainforest.

Description
There are two major depictions of it. Some described them as a hairy humanoid cyclops. This version is often said to have a gaping mouth on its abdomen. Others claim that it is a modern day sighting of the giant ground sloth, an animal estimated to have gone extinct during the early holocene. Skeptics point out that there haven't been any fossil records of ground sloths for thousands of years

Terminology
According to Felipe Ferreira Vander Velden, its name is a combination of the Tupi-Guarani words "mbaé", "pi", and "guari", meaning "a thing that has a bent [or] crooked foot [or] paw". Other names by which they are referred to  include the Karitiana kida harara, and the Machiguenga segamai.

See also
 List of legendary creatures
 Mylodon

References

Sources
Martin, Paul S. 2007. Twilight of the Mammoths: Ice Age Extinctions and the Rewilding of America. University of California Press. 
Shepard, G. H. 2002. "Primates and the Matsigenka" in Agustín Fuentes & Linda D. Wolfe. Primates Face to Face: The Conservation Implications of Human-nonhuman Primate Interconnections. Cambridge University Press. 

Brazilian folklore
Hominid cryptids
Indigenous Amazonian legendary creatures